May 15 - Eastern Orthodox Church calendar - May 17

All fixed commemorations below celebrated on May 29 by Orthodox Churches on the Old Calendar.

For May 16th, Orthodox Churches on the Old Calendar commemorate the Saints listed on May 3.

Saints
 Hieromartyr Alexander of Jerusalem, Archbishop (251)
 Saint Papylinus the Martyr
 Martyrs Bachtisius, Isaac and Symeon of Persia (339)
 Saint Theodore the Sanctified of Tabennisi, disciple of Saint Pachomios the Great (367)
 Martyrs Abda (Audas) and Abdjesus (Audiesus) the Bishops, Benjamin, and 38 other martyrs at Beth-Kashkar in the Persian Empire, under Ardashir II (375), including:
 16 priests, 9 deacons, 6 monks, and 7 unnamed virgins.
 Saint Neadius (Neadios), Bishop and Wonderworker.
 Saint Bardas, founder of the monastery of the Forerunner in Petra, Constantinople (5th-6th century)
 Martyrdom of the 44 Holy Sabaite fathers, monk-martyrs of the Great Lavra of St. Sabbas the Sanctified, massacred by the Saracens (610 or 614)
 Martyr Peter of Blachernae (761) 
 Saint Thomas I, Patriarch of Jerusalem (820)
 Saint George of Mitylene, Bishop (821 or 842)
 Saint Nicholas Mystikos, Patriarch of Constantinople (925)

Pre-Schism Western saints
 Saint Fort (Fort de Bordeaux), first Bishop of Bordeaux in France, venerated as a martyr (c. 1st century?)
 Saint Peregrinus, Bishop of Terni (138)
 Saint Peregrine of Auxerre, martyr, the first bishop of Auxerre and the builder of its first cathedral (261 or 304)
 Martyrs Felix and Gennadius, at Uzalis in Africa
 Martyrs Vitus, Modestus, and Crescentia at Lucania (c. 303)
 Saint Hilary, Bishop of Pavia, one of the bishops in the north of Italy who fought against Arianism (376)
 Saint Possidius, Bishop of Calama in Numidia in North Africa, a friend of Saint Augustine of Hippo (c. 370 - c. 440)
 Saint Primael, ascetic, from Britain, he went to Brittany and became a hermit near Quimper (c. 450)
 Blessed child-saint Musa of Rome (5th century)
 Saint Carantac (Carantog, Caimach, Carnath), Welsh prince who aided St Patrick in the enlightenment of Ireland (5th century)
 Saint Fidolus (Phal), Abbot at Isle-Aumont, south of Troyes (c. 540 - 549)
 Saint Germerius, Bishop of Toulouse in France for fifty years (560)
 Saint Brendan the Navigator, abbot of Clonfert (c. 577)
 Saint Domnolus, Bishop of Le Mans (581)
 Saint Carantoc, an abbot who founded the church of Llangrannog in Wales (6th century)
 Saint Honoratus of Amiens, the seventh bishop of Amiens (c. 600)
 Saint Annobert (Alnobert), a monk at Almenêches, consecrated Bishop of Séez in France (c. 689)
 Saint Franchy (Francovæcus), a monk at St Martin de la Bretonnière in France, later a hermit in the Nivernais (Diocese of Nevers) (7th century)

Post-Schism Orthodox saints
 Saints Cassian (1537) and Laurence (1548), disciples of Venerable Cornelius of Komel, Abbots of Komel ("Korneliev" Monastery), Vologda.
 New Hieromartyr Teodor (Nestorović) of Vršac, Bishop of Vršac in Banat, Serbia (1595)
 New Martyr Nicholas of Metsovo, at Trikala, whose relics are at Meteora (1617)

New martyrs and confessors
 Venerable Hieromonk Matthew of Yaransk the Wonderworker ( 'Mitrophan Kuzmich Zvetsov' ) (1927)
 New Martyr Vukasin of Serbia, under the Ustashi terrorists (1941)

Other commemorations
 Foundation of the church of Saint Euphemia, near the Neorion (port facilities), by the Dolmabahçe Palace of Constantinople.
 Translation of the relics (1545) of Saint Ephraim, Abbot of Perekop, Wonderworker of Novgorod (1492)
 Commemoration of Saint Macarius (Notaras) of Corinth (1805) in the village of Myloi, Samos island.

Icon gallery

Notes

References

Sources
 May. Self-Ruled Antiochian Orthodox Christian Archdiocese of North America.
 May 16/29. Orthodox Calendar (PRAVOSLAVIE.RU).
 May 29 / May 16. HOLY TRINITY RUSSIAN ORTHODOX CHURCH (A parish of the Patriarchate of Moscow).
 Complete List of Saints. Protection of the Mother of God Church (POMOG).
 May 16. Latin Saints of the Orthodox Patriarchate of Rome. 
 May 16. The Roman Martyrology.
Greek Sources
 Great Synaxaristes:  16 ΜΑΪΟΥ. ΜΕΓΑΣ ΣΥΝΑΞΑΡΙΣΤΗΣ.
  Συναξαριστής. 16 Μαΐου. ECCLESIA.GR. (H ΕΚΚΛΗΣΙΑ ΤΗΣ ΕΛΛΑΔΟΣ). 
Russian Sources
  29 мая (16 мая). Православная Энциклопедия под редакцией Патриарха Московского и всея Руси Кирилла (электронная версия). (Orthodox Encyclopedia - Pravenc.ru).
  16 мая (ст.ст.) 29 мая 2013 (нов. ст.). Русская Православная Церковь Отдел внешних церковных связей. (DECR).

May in the Eastern Orthodox calendar